Elias Hurtig (born 1997) is a Swedish singer and rapper. In 2022, Hurtig got a number 1 hit on Sverigetopplistan with the song ”30 Personer” while featuring on the song with Hov1.  He was previously a member of the group Hov1.

Discography

Singles

References

1997 births
Living people
Swedish male singers
People from Stockholm